The 1971 Davidson Wildcats football team represented Davidson College as a member of the Southern Conference (SoCon) during the 1971 NCAA University Division football season. Led by second-year head coach Dave Fagg, the Wildcats compiled an overall record of 1–9 with a mark of 0–6 in conference play, placing last out of seven teams in the SoCon.

Schedule

References

Davidson
Davidson Wildcats football seasons
Davidson Wildcats football